Francis Neyle Marx Jr. (October 28, 1914 – September 30, 2006) was an American film and television actor.

Morrow was born in Jacksonville, Florida. He began his screen career in 1940, appearing in the film Drums of the Desert. In the same year he appeared in the films Meet the Wildcat and Three Men from Texas. In 1941, Morrow starred in the film The Phantom Cowboy, and appeared in the film Raiders of the Desert. He regularly appeared in films made by film director Samuel Fuller.

Later film appearances include Danger in the Pacific (1942), Where Are Your Children? (1943), The Cisco Kid Returns (1945) and Spoilers of the North (1947), The Big Sombrero (1949), Harbor of Missing Men (1950), Let's Go Navy! (1951), The Raiders (1952), Hell and High Water (1954), Run of the Arrow (1957), The Crimson Kimono (1959), and Shock Corridor (1963). His final film credit was for the 1964 film The Naked Kiss.

Morrow died in September 2006 in Los Angeles, California, at the age of 91. He was buried in Holy Cross Cemetery, Culver City.

References

External links 

Rotten Tomatoes profile

1914 births
2006 deaths
People from Jacksonville, Florida
Male actors from Jacksonville, Florida
American male film actors
American male television actors
20th-century American male actors
Burials at Holy Cross Cemetery, Culver City